Lee Joon-hwan (born 5 March 2002) is a South Korean judoka.

He won gold medals at the 2022 Tbilisi Grand Slam and the 2022 Ulaanbaatar Grand Slam.

References

External links
 

2002 births
Living people
South Korean male judoka
South Korean male athletes
21st-century South Korean people